Eucalyptus nudicaulis is a species of mallee that is endemic to a small area in north-west Queensland. It has smooth, mottled grey bark, narrow lance-shaped adult leaves, flower buds in groups of seven, white flowers and cup-shaped to hemispherical fruit.

Description
It has smooth, mottled grey to silvery bark. Flowering occurs between February and March and the flowers are white.

Taxonomy and naming
The specific epithet (nudicaulis) is derived from the Latin nudus meaning "naked" or "bare" and caulis meaning "stem", referring to the smooth bark of this species.

Distribution and habitat
This eucalypt grows on quartzite ridges, in rocky gullies and on steep hillsides in a small area near Mount Isa and Cloncurry.

Conservation status
This eucalypt is classified as "vulnerable" under the Queensland Government Nature Conservation Act 1992. It is only known from about six small populations.

See also
List of Eucalyptus species

References

nudicaulis
Myrtales of Australia
Flora of Queensland
Plants described in 1991